Kevin Alan Ohlson (born March 29, 1960) is an American lawyer who serves as the chief judge of the United States Court of Appeals for the Armed Forces.

Biography

Ohlson was born in Holden, Massachusetts and raised in Sterling, Massachusetts, graduating from Wachusett Regional High School in 1978. He received a Bachelor of Arts degree in 1982 from Washington and Jefferson College. He received a Juris Doctor in 1985 from the University of Virginia School of Law. He was commissioned as an officer in the United States Army in 1986, serving as a judge advocate and paratrooper. In 1990, he served in the Gulf War, earning a Bronze Star. From 1991 to 1997, he served as an assistant United States Attorney in the District of Columbia. From 1997 to 2001, he served as Chief of Staff to the Deputy Attorney General. From 2001 to 2002, he was a member of the Board of Immigration Appeals. From 2002 to 2007, he served as Deputy Director of the Executive Office for Immigration Review, serving as Director from 2007 to 2009. From 2009 to January 2011, he served as Chief of Staff to United States Attorney General Eric Holder. From 2011 to 2013, he served as Chief of the Professional Misconduct Review Unit in the United States Department of Justice.

Court of Appeals service

On September 15, 2011, President Barack Obama nominated Ohlson to serve as a United States Circuit Judge of the United States Court of Appeals for the Armed Forces, to the seat vacated by Judge Andrew S. Effron, who took senior status on September 30, 2011. This is an Article I Judicial appointment with a term of fifteen years. His nomination received a hearing before the Senate Armed Services Committee. His nomination was returned to the President on January 3, 2013, due to the sine die adjournment of the Senate. President Obama renominated him on March 21, 2013. The Senate Armed Services Committee again held a hearing on his nomination on September 19, 2013, and reported his nomination to the floor on September 24, 2013. The Senate confirmed his nomination on October 16, 2013, by unanimous consent. He received his commission on November 1, 2013, and took the judicial oath the same day. By law, his commission will expire on July 31, 2028, at which time his term will end, unless he is reappointed. He became Chief Judge on August 1, 2021.

Personal
Ohlson lives in Virginia with his wife, Dr. Carolyn Davis, and their two children, Matthew and Katherine.

References

1960 births
Living people
People from Holden, Massachusetts
People from Sterling, Massachusetts
Washington & Jefferson College alumni
University of Virginia School of Law alumni
United States Army officers
United States Army personnel of the Gulf War
Lawyers from Washington, D.C.
Judges of the United States Court of Appeals for the Armed Forces
United States court of appeals judges appointed by Barack Obama
21st-century American judges